Bhavani is a Municipality in Erode District, Tamil Nadu, India. Bhavani is also known as "Carpet City" as it is known for its carpet industry; blankets and carpets manufactured in the town are known as Bhavani Jamakkalam. It is a grade II municipality.

Sangameswarar Temple, one of the seven holy Shiva shrines of the Kongu Nadu, is located in Bhavani near the confluence of the rivers. The temple serves 18 villages surrounding the town. The  Kooduthurai is the confluence of rivers Cauvery, Bhavani and invisible divine Amudha. And near urachikottai, Jeeva samadhi of  vallalar follower "Arul annai" is present.

Geography 

It has an average elevation of 193 metres (633 feet).
It lies at the confluence of the rivers Kaveri, the largest river in Tamil Nadu and Bhavani, the second largest river in Tamil Nadu, with the invisible mystic Sarasvati River. Hence this place is known as the Triveni Sangam of South. The Sangameswarar Temple dedicated to Lord Shiva, built at the confluence of these rivers, is a sacred place for Hindus.  The temple is located on the northern bank where the rivers meet. The five hill temples of this area such as Sankari, Tiruchengode, Padmagiri, Mangalagiri and Vedagiri are surrounding this Temple.

Demographics

According to 2011 census, Bhavani had a population of 39,225 with a sex-ratio of 1,005 females for every 1,000 males, much above the national average of 929. A total of 3,519 were under the age of six, constituting 1,830 males and 1,689 females. Scheduled Castes and Scheduled Tribes accounted for 8.29% and 0.1% of the population respectively. The average literacy of the town was 77.12%, compared to the national average of 72.99%. The town had a total of 11,147 households. There were a total of 17,664 workers, comprising 65 cultivators, 61 main agricultural labourers, 1,114 in house hold industries, 15,575 other workers, 849 marginal workers, 8 marginal cultivators, 45 marginal agricultural labourers, 146 marginal workers in household industries and 650 other marginal workers. As per the religious census of 2011, Bhavani had 93.33% Hindus, 4.24% Muslims, 2.35% Christians, 0.01% Sikhs, 0.05% following other religions and 0.02% following no religion or did not indicate any religious preference.

Culture

Sri Sellandiamman temple is the main temple for more 18 villages surrounding Bhavani town. The mega-festival of Bhavani is celebrated during February and March (Masi in Tamil month). Festival celebrated for more than 45 days, more than 100 years every community in southern India have celebrated as per the custom in Sri Sellandiamman temple during festival. Nearly 39 communities participate in this grand festival.

Kasi Vishalakshi Udanamar Kasi Viswanathar temple is located nearby Kududurai. This temple fondly called Chinnakoil. Bairavasthami valipadu is famous in this temple. Navagrahas in this temple are with devi's, i.e. all navagrahas are with their wives in separate madapam. Treated only few temples navagrahas with wive's. Bramothsavam is celebrated in panguni month. On a day of panguni uthiram lord Thiruananikka is held then temple car festival will be started. During karthikai month 1008 sangabishekam is held in temple in grand manner.

The holy waters of Bhavani are known as Kaveri theertham, Bhavani and Amirtha River, Surya theertham and Gayatri theertham. People perform last rites here.

The temple is situated at the confluence spot of the Kaveri and Bhavani rivers, known as Kooduthurai. Of the seven holy Shiva centers of the Kongu Region, Bhavani is one. The scriptural name is Thirunana. The 13-day car festival in the Tamil Month Chithirai (April–May) is the most famous in the temple attracting lakhs of devotees.

Also on Adiperukku day, Ammavasyas, especially Thai Ammavasya, eclipse days are devotionally followed in the Bhavani temple by taking bath in the rivers and performing rites. Many devotees from other states also come during November and December months corresponding to Tamil Karthikai and Margazhi.

During the Sabari mala season, many devotees come and do pujas in this temple, on their way to Kerala. Special pujas are performed to the Lord and Goddess on English and Tamil New Year days, Pongal and Deepavali days. The annual Bhrammotsavam here is celebrated in the month of Aadi (Cancer).

Politics
Bhavani is part of the Tiruppur Lok Sabha constituency in Tamil Nadu. Earlier, before the rearrangement of constituencies in 2008, it was part of the Gobichettipalayam constituency.

Bhavani Jamakkalam
Bhavani Jamakkalam refers to blankets and carpets manufactured in Bhavani. It has been recognized as a Geographical indication by the Government of India in 2005–06. In the late nineteenth century, competition from British made textiles led Indian weavers to invent new types of garments. In Bhavani, a community of weavers called Jangamars weaved a type of blanket using colored coarse threads called Jamakkalam. The popularity of the product led to the production of jamakkalams by other weavers replacing the production of traditional sarees and other cloths.

Transport

Bhavani is connected with local buses to almost all parts of the district of Erode. The Bhavani bus station is located on the banks of Kaveri river at the northern end of the town. City buses connect major areas like Erode Junction, Thindal, Central BS, Surampatti, Anthiyur, Komarapalayam, Gopichettipalayam, Mettur etc.,. The town depends on two major National highways, NH-544 connecting Salem-Cochin and NH-544H connecting Thoppur-Erode. Erode is the major transportation hub for Bhavani.

Neighborhoods
Komarapalayam (2 km)
Pallipalayam (13 km)
Erode (14 km) 
Lakshmi Nagar (2 km)
Ooratchikottai (2 km)
Anthiyur (18 km)
Paruvatchi (11 km)
Chithode (6 km)
Nasiyanur (15 km)
Texvalley (11 km)
Attayampalayam (12 km)
Kavindapadi (16 km)
Sankagiri (22 km)

References

Cities and towns in Erode district
Hindu holy cities